Fathima Matha Chapel, Kandeswaram, is an Eastern Catholic chapel in Thrissur, Kerala State in India.

The chapel is under St Mary's Church Cheloor/Edathirinji. The old chapel was blessed on 13 May 1956 and the new chapel building was blessed in 2007 by Mar Joseph Paster Neelankavil CMI (Emeritus Bishop of Sagar Diocese). Fr. Joy Puthenveettil  was the Vicar in this period.

Churches in Thrissur district
Eastern Catholic churches in India
Syro-Malabar Catholic church buildings
Chapels in India